Proverbs 22 is the 22nd chapter of the Book of Proverbs in the Hebrew Bible or the Old Testament of the Christian Bible. The book is a compilation of several wisdom literature collections, with the heading in 1:1 may be intended to regard Solomon as the traditional author of the whole book, but the dates of the individual collections are difficult to determine, and the book probably obtained its final shape in the post-exilic period. This chapter records parts of the second and third collection of the book.

Text
The original text is written in Hebrew language. This chapter is divided into 35 verses.

Textual witnesses
Some early manuscripts containing the text of this chapter in Hebrew are of the Masoretic Text, which includes the Aleppo Codex (10th century), and Codex Leningradensis (1008).

There is also a translation into Koine Greek known as the Septuagint, made in the last few centuries BC. Extant ancient manuscripts of the Septuagint version include Codex Vaticanus (B; B; 4th century), Codex Sinaiticus (S; BHK: S; 4th century), and Codex Alexandrinus (A; A; 5th century).

Analysis
Verse 1–16 belong to a section regarded as the second collection in the book of Proverbs (comprising Proverbs 10:1–22:16), also called "The First 'Solomonic' Collection" (the second one in Proverbs 25:1–29:27). The collection contains 375 sayings, each of which consists of two parallel phrases, except for Proverbs 19:7 which consists of three parts.

Verses 17–29 are grouped to the third collection in the book (comprising Proverbs 22:17–24:22), which consists of seven instructions of various lengths:
 1st instruction (22:17–23:11)
 2nd instruction (23:12–18)
 3rd instruction (23:19–21)
 4th instruction (23:22–25)
 5th instruction (23:26–24:12)
 6th instruction (24:13–20) and 
 7th instruction (24:21–22)

The sayings are predominantly in the form of synonymous parallelism, preceded by a general superscription of the entire collection in 22:17a: "The words of the wise" (or "Sayings of the Wise").  This collection consists of an introduction that the youths should be instructed and exhorted to listen to and obey their "teachers" (parents), followed by a series of admonitions and prohibitions coupled with a variety of clauses, primarily presented in short parental instructions (cf. 23:15, 22; 24:13, 21). 

The 'thirty sayings' (Proverbs 22:20) in this collection are thought to be modelled on the 'thirty chapters' in Egyptian Instruction of Amen-em-ope the son of Kanakht (most likely during the Ramesside Period ca. 1300–1075 BCE), although the parallels extend only in Proverbs 22:17–23:11 and the extent of the dependence is debatable.

Good name (22:1–16)
Verse 1 teaches that a name is 'an expression of the inner character and worth of its bearer' (cf. Genesis 32:28) and that it survives one's death (cf. Proverbs 10:7).
Verse 2 observes that 'rich and poor' are to be found side-by-side and are equally the creatures of God (cf. Proverbs 29:13), and verse 9 urges to show generosity to the poor (cf. 14:31). Verse 6 emphasizes the importance of parental instruction in the home (cf. 19:18), with verse 15 reinforcing the value of the rod in educating children (cf. Proverbs 3:24). Verse 13 displays the inventiveness of a lazy person in making excuses for doing nothing (cf. 26:13). Verse 14 resumes the theme of 'the seductress' from the first section of the book, recalling the seductive speech of the loose woman (cf. 5:3), which, in conjunction with 'pit', may imply the entrance to the underworld (cf. Proverbs 1:12; 2:18-19; 5:5. 27).

Verse 1
A good name is rather to be chosen than great riches,
and loving favor rather than silver and gold.
"A good name": in Hebrew it is only "a name", but he idea of the name being "good" is implied as it has the connotation here of a reputation.
"Loving favor": in Hebrew "favor of goodness".

Sayings of the wise (22:17–29)
This section contains the first of seven sets of instruction in a collection titled "Sayings of the Wise" (22:17), with verses 17–21 as an introduction. Verses 22–23 warn against the oppression of the poor using the legal system ('at the gate') as an instrument for the exploitation (cf. Isaiah 10]8:1-2; Amos 5:12), because God as the protector of the poor will take up their cause (cf. Exodus 22:22–24). Verses 24–25 warn that the 'ways' of hotheads are ultimately the way of death.

Verses 22–23
Do not rob the poor because he is poor,
neither oppress the afflicted in the gate;
for the Lord will plead their cause,
and spoil the soul of those who spoiled them.

See also

Related Bible parts: Psalm 1, Proverbs 9, Proverbs 18, Proverbs 23, Proverbs 24, Proverbs 28

References

Sources

External links
 Jewish translations:
 Mishlei - Proverbs - Chapter 22 (Judaica Press) translation [with Rashi's commentary] at Chabad.org
 Christian translations:
 Online Bible at GospelHall.org (ESV, KJV, Darby, American Standard Version, Bible in Basic English)
 Book of Proverbs Chapter 22 King James Version
  Various versions

22